Post-amendment to the Tamil Nadu Entertainment Tax Act 1939 on 27 September 2011, Gross jumped to 130 per cent of Nett for films with non-Tamil titles and U certificates as well. Commercial Taxes Department disclosed 68 crore in entertainment tax revenue for the year.

A list of Tamil language films produced in the Tamil cinema in India that have been or are to be released in 2013.

Released films

January – March

April – June

July – September

October – December

Overseas Tamil language films
Tamil language also produced outside India. Below are the list Tamil language movie produced outside India

Dubbed films

Awards

Notable deaths

References

2013
2013 in Indian cinema
Tamil
2010s Tamil-language films